Barbora Řeháčková (born 1979) is a Czech jazz singer.

Biography 
As a little girl, Barbora Řeháčková sang and danced in the Jičín folk dance group "Jičíňáček". With them she performed all over Europe. In 1999 she graduated at the Teplice Conservatory in violin, and then she played as a violist for three years with the "Severočeská Filharmonie Teplice". At a jam session in 1999 her love for jazz singing sparked. Soon afterwards she sang with leading musicians and jazz bands on Czech and foreign stages. In 2000 she had toured the United Kingdom with the Czech National Symphony Orchestra under the musical direction of Paul Freeman and Libor Pešek. From 2008 to 2011 she sang in Greece under the stage name Barbora Mindrinu. Under this she had also released the debut album "Close to You" with a fifteen-piece orchestra and Chantal Poulain as a guest.

After returning home, she adopted the stage name Barbora Swinx. In 2019 she had appearances with the music group "Barbora Swinx Boys" in the Prague jazz club Reduta. She also played there when Czech President Vaclav Havel and Bill Clinton visited the Reduta. But she also performed on and off in the exclusive Tower Park Oblaca in Prague. The repertoire, but also her artistic style, is shaped by Ella Fitzgerald's songs. During her jazz career, Barbora Řeháčková performed with the stars of Czech jazz, pop and classical. She took the stage with Vlasta Průchová, Eva Pilarová, Petra Janů, Dagmar Pecková, Leona Machálková, Petr Janda, Petr Pipa, and 4-Tet. She sang with the band by Felix Slováček, the swing band by Ferdinand Havlík, Bohemia Big Band Bohuslava Volfa, Golden Big Band Prague, Petra Soviče and the vocal quartet The Swings. She appeared at several domestic and worldwide festivals such as "Jazz on the Castle". Barbora Řeháčková initiated the „Porgy & Bess project“ in the Czech Republic - an original jazz interpretation of George Gershwin's operas. As part of this project, she sang with Lee Andrew Davison and the accompaniment of the Prague Film Orchestra under Jiří Korynta with the Polish-Baltic Philharmonic in Gdańsk. In 2019 and 2020 she opened the Prague Opera season with the well-known soloists of the National Theater Zdeněk Plecht, Pavel Švinger, Igor Loškár under the name „II Bohemo“ as part of a festive concert.

Discography 
 Close to You (as Barbora Mindrinu), Album, 2010
 Colors of Love, Album, 2015, Arta Records
 September Bossa, Single
 Lzi jak chces, Single
 If you would ask me, Single

Awards 
In 2012 she was declared the “Most Beautiful Jazz Diva in the Czech Republic” by Super.cz website.

References

External links 

1979 births
Living people
People from Jičín
Musicians from Prague
21st-century Czech women singers